= Hieropotamon =

Town of ancient Bithynia

Coordinates: 40°04′58″N 31°41′25″E

Hieropotamon was a town of ancient Bithynia, inhabited in Byzantine times. The name does not occur among ancient authors but is inferred from epigraphic and other evidence.

Its site is located below Tahir, Asiatic Turkey.
